Greatest Hits, Vol. 2 is, as the title implies, a greatest hits compilation by country singer Johnny Cash, released on Columbia Records in 1971 (see 1971 in music). It combines older songs from Cash's years with Sun Records ("Hey Porter" and "Folsom Prison Blues", among others) with more recent hits, such as "A Boy Named Sue" from Cash's At San Quentin album and the Kris Kristofferson-penned "Sunday Mornin' Comin' Down". "Big River", one of the songs from the Sun years, was released as a single. The album was certified Gold on 1/25/1977 and Platinum on 2/16/1995 by the R.I.A.A.

Track listing

Charts 
Album – Billboard (United States)

Singles – Billboard (United States)

External links 
 Luma Electronic's Johnny Cash discography listing

References

Albums produced by Bob Johnston
1971 greatest hits albums
Johnny Cash compilation albums
Columbia Records compilation albums